Creo is a family of Computer-aided design (CAD) apps supporting product design for discrete manufacturers and is developed by PTC. The suite consists of apps, each delivering a distinct set of capabilities for a user role within product development.

Creo runs on Microsoft Windows and provides apps for 3D CAD parametric feature solid modeling, 3D direct modeling, 2D orthographic views, Finite Element Analysis and simulation, schematic design, technical illustrations, and viewing and visualization. Creo can also be paired with Mastercam (Machining based software) to machine any designed model in a minimal timeframe.

Software and features 
Creo Elements and Creo Parametric compete directly with CATIA, Siemens NX/Solid Edge, and SolidWorks. The Creo suite of apps replace and supersede PTC’s products formerly known as Pro/ENGINEER, CoCreate, and ProductView. Creo has many different software package solutions and features. Creo Illustrate is a good example. Creo Parametric allows users create 3D models with many features such as sweeps, revolves and extrusions. This makes it one of the leading cad softwares that is in use for many engineering and technical based careers.

PTC began developing Creo in 2009, and announced it using the code name Project Lightning at PlanetPTC Live, in Las Vegas, in June 2010. In October 2010, PTC unveiled the product name for Project Lightning to be Creo. PTC released Creo 1.0 in June 2011.
PTC Creo has a headquarters located inside the innovation district of Boston, Massachusetts. There are also numerous locations all across the United States.

System requirements for PTC Creo are relatively low, it is offered for Windows 8 and 10. The CPU requirements are Intel Core, Intel Xeon, Intel Celeron, Intel Pentium, AMD Athlon, AMD Opteron. Video display requirements are any 3D capable graphics cards with OpenGL support. 4 gigabytes of RAM is required to run PTC Creo Parametric, as well as a minimum of 2 gigabytes of hard disk space. Creo also has 24/7 online support to assist any user with questions. Creo requires active internet when being used to be able to refresh and connect to the Creo servers.

Creo apps are available in English, German, Russian, French, Italian, Spanish, Japanese, Korean, Chinese Simplified, and Chinese Traditional. The extent of localization varies from full translation of the product (including Help) to user interface only.

Creo is part of a broader product development system developed by PTC. It connects to PTC’s other solutions that aid product development, including Windchill for Product Lifecycle Management (PLM), Mathcad for engineering calculations and Arbortext for enterprise publishing software.

See also 
 Parametric Technology Corporation
 Creo Elements/Pro
 Creo Elements/View
 SolidWorks
 Autodesk Inventor
 I-DEAS
 Solid Edge
 Siemens NX
 Mastercam

References

External links 
 

Product design
Computer-aided design software for Windows